The Eddie Cantor Comedy Theatre is a half-hour filmed American comedy series produced by Eddie Cantor and made at Ziv Television Programs, Inc. for first-run syndication. Cantor hosted and performed on each show. Thirty-nine episodes were produced and aired in 1955 before Cantor decided the show was too much for him to continue doing.

Premise
During November 1954, Cantor explained his idea for television success to columnist Erskine Johnson: "The size of TV screens demands intimacy, close-ups, and not more than half a dozen people on stage at the same time".

This was an unusual mixed genre show, combining elements of comedy, variety and anthology. Each episode might have one or multiple guest stars, who would interact with Cantor before and after any sketches. (There were also supporting actors and extras). Some episodes had a single long sketch with an intermission, others had two or three short sketches, while a few dispensed with sketches for musical variety. The sketches were always light-hearted comedies, with Cantor sometimes performing in them alongside the guest star and supporting players. "I'm the host, but I get around" Cantor said.

A typical show opened with a theater marquee displaying the shows name, the camera moving inside the theater lobby, where a large photo poster of Cantor was displayed, while the guest star name(s) appeared on screen. Cantor would appear backstage, introduce that episode's guest star(s), and they would engage in banter for a few minutes. A sketch might ensue, the conceit being that it was performed before an actual theater audience. Cantor would reappear to introduce a commercial break, often by way of a short skit. The last half of the sketch (or a second sketch, or musical numbers) would follow. When complete, Cantor and the guest star(s) would reengage before a theater curtain to applause. Cantor would then close with a short song just before the credits rolled.

Production
Worn out from doing live television shows, Cantor signed a contract with Ziv Television during the summer of 1954 to do a filmed program. The seven year contract called for 39 films (episodes) per year for a comedy and variety show. Some newspapers reported that the show would have a $9 million dollar budget in order to complete 39 episodes. However, John Sinn of Ziv Television clarified this by saying the average budget per TV episode was $53,000, while the larger figure included seven years of radio shows.

By early November Cantor had completed filming several episodes, while Ziv Television announced the first episode would be available for airing on January 23, 1955.

Columnist Eve Starr reported that Cantor's Comedy Theatre had "sold to 60 syndicated spots its first two weeks on the market". One major sponsor was Burgermeister Beer, which purchased spots in many West Coast markets. Most sponsors however were buying for a single market, such as the First Trust Company and First National Bank, both of Lincoln, Nebraska, which jointly purchased the spot for their city.

By late March 1955 only a few weeks worth of filming remained for the first season, while the number of broadcasting spots sold nationwide approached 180.

Response
John Lester in his syndicated column said the show "was disappointing in its premiere last week, to say the very least and to say it as kindly as possible". John Crosby was more blunt in his column: "The show's a mishmash. Cantor bursts into song... Then there are the sketches, the like of which have not been seen in a long, long time... it reminded me strongly of the sort of thing you'd find in a Broadway revue around 1922". One reviewer voiced a common opinion among critics; after giving the guest star lineup for an episode, he said: "That's a lot of talent for Eddie to hide while he hogs the camera".

Erskine Johnson reported in September 1955 that Cantor wanted to stop doing the show after 39 episodes because "It's just too much for me".

Broadcast history
The first episode broadcast was on Monday, January 23, 1955. Since it was syndicated, stations ran it on different days of the week, and at various times, usually after network programming had ended for the evening. In many markets it replaced the show Foreign Intrigue, which had had the same sponsors. Newspapers often shortened the name in television listings to Eddie Cantor Show. Stations first started broadcasting the show anywhere from January thru April depending on the market. Episodes were often skipped or shown out of release order. Because it was syndicated and stations had already paid for one-time showings of the episodes, it continued to be broadcast as late as August 1956.

Episodes
In the following table multiple sketches are indicated by numbers in parentheses. "Original Air Date", except for the first episode, is omitted: all 39 episodes were available for broadcasting by May 1955.

Notes

References

External links
The Eddie Cantor Comedy Theatre at CVTA with episode list

1950s American anthology television series
1955 American television series debuts
1955 American television series endings
First-run syndicated television programs in the United States